The Kijimuna (Okinawan: , kijimunaa, also kijimun 木の精), or Bunagaya, are creatures of the mythology native to the island of Okinawa. They are said to look around three or four years old and have red hair.

About 
The kijimuna are small wood spirits according to Okinawan mythology. The kijimuna are said to live in trees, but the most common one is the 'gajumaru' or banyan tree. They are often described as being child-sized, with red hair covering their bodies and large heads. They are also known to be excellent fisherman, able to catch many fish, but then only eating one of the eyes of the fish before leaving the rest of it. The Kijimuna festival
in Okinawa is named after them. Another name for the kijimuna is "bungaya," which means roughly "Large-Headed." The Kijimuna are known to be very mischievous, playing pranks and tricking humans. One of their best-known tricks is to lie upon a person's chest, making them unable to move or breathe. This is known as "kanashibari." Even though the Kijimuna are tricksters, they have been known to make friends with humans. However, these relationships often go sour. A kijimuna may offer to carry a human on its back as it leaps through the mountains and over the seas. The kijimuna dislike people passing gas on their backs, however, and will immediately throw the human off, no matter where they were at the moment. The kijimuna also hate octopuses.

Stories
The kijimuna are a common subject in Okinawan folk tales. Many of their stories begin with the kijimuna becoming a human's friend and then ending with the relationship going bad. One story tells of a kijimuna's friend burning down his tree, so the kijimuna fled to the mountains.

In Popular Culture 
A Kijimuna appears as a recurring character in Disney Japan's spinoff anime series Stitch!. His special power is sneezing because his nose is powerful enough to blow anyone away.

In Google Doodle Champion Island Games, The Kijimuna are described as having red hair and body and love racing on the beach.

Set in Okinawa, the anime The Aquatope on White Sand features a Kijimuna that appears frequently in earlier episodes. It is implied to be the source of visions experienced by visitors to the Gama Gama Aquarium.

See also
 :ja:マジムン (majimun, or okinawa equivalent of yokai)

References

Okinawan legendary creatures
Mythological tricksters
Kappa (folklore)